The following radio stations broadcast on FM frequency 88.8 MHz:

Algeria
Annaba FM at Annaba

Australia
Pine Radio pirate broadcast heard around sydney and newcastle some nights.

China 
 CNR The Voice of China in Meizhou
 CRI Hit FM in Wuhan (stopped airing in 2019)

Germany
Radio Berlin at Berlin

Malaysia
 Gegar in Kuantan, Pahang

Nepal
Nepali ko Radio 88.8, Kathmandu, Nepal

Turkey
 Gebze FM in Istanbul and Bursa

United Kingdom
BBC Radio 2 at Crystal Palace and other locations.
BBC Radio Jersey at Saint Helier, Jersey, Channel Islands

References

Lists of radio stations by frequency